Basúchil (Bajichi), water well in the Raramuri Language,  is a town in the municipality of Guerrero, State of Chihuahua, Mexico.  It was founded in 1649 as a presidio to protect the jesuit mission in the Tarahumara Papigochi region a few miles to the west, now Cd. Guerrero. Basúchil was initially named La Villa de Aguilar by his founder Diego Guajardo Fajardo governor of the New Vizcaya, New Spain. In 1652 the town was destroyed and its inhabitants assassinated by an attack incited by the lider Tarahumara ,  years later it was resettled and renamed Basúchil. The Adolfo Lopez Mateos-Madera Highway (Route 16) passes on the east side.

Abraham González, later governor of Chihuahua, was born in Basúchil in 1864. Ángel González, the ranchera composer best known for his seminal narcocorrido, "Contrabando y Traición," lived most of his life in Basúchil.

Economy
In the twenty century Mennonites from the area of Cuauhtemoc, Chihuahua introduced apple trees, becoming one of the main industries of the region also, corn, beans, and potatoes are cultivated throughout the region.

Notes

External links
 Photographs of Basúchil at Pueblos America
 Guarnición de soldados en la villa de Aguilar at Archivo General de Indias
 Pacificación de tarahumaras at Archivo General de Indias
 Video Agosto Basúchil Monsoon Season 

Populated places in Chihuahua (state)
Populated places established in 1640
1640 establishments in the Spanish Empire